Fred Thomas "Pop" "Pops" "Big" Long (January 22, 1896 – March 23, 1966) was an American professional baseball player in the Negro leagues and a college football coach.  He was the head football coach at four historically black colleges and universities in Texas between 1921 and 1965, compiling a career record of 227–151–31.  He was the head coach at Wiley College in Marshall, Texas for 35 years from 1923 to 1947 and again from 1956 to 1965.  He led the Wiley Wildcats football team to three black college football national championships, in 1928, 1932, and 1945.

Early life and education
Fred Long was born in Decatur, Illinois to Hinton A. "Cook" Long and his wife Idlean Long. He graduated from Decatur High School in 1913 and entered Millikin University in Decatur in the spring of 1915.   He completed his Bachelor of Science degree in Commerce and Finance in less than four years, becoming the first African American to graduate from Millikin University.  He was a star athlete while at Millikin, lettering in football (1915–1917) and baseball (1916–1918).  The Long-Vanderburg Scholars Program at Millikin University is named for him and Millikin's first African-American female graduate, Marian Vanderburg.  He was joined at Millikin in the fall of 1915 by his brother Harry Long who had graduated from Decatur High School that spring.  Fred entered the Army after graduation and served two years.

Professional baseball career
In 1920, Fred Long became an outfielder for the Detroit Stars of the newly formed Negro National League.  He returned to the Stars again in 1921 and one more season in 1926 as a reserve outfielder.  He also played outfield for the Indianapolis ABCs during the 1925 season, a total of four seasons in the Negro National League.

College coaching career
Long's college football coaching career spanned 45 years, from 1921 to 1965. During that long career his teams captured several conference championships and at least a share of three black college football national championships in 1928, 1932, and 1945. During that same period he also served as athletic director for the colleges he worked for and often coached every sport those schools offered including track, baseball, basketball, tennis, and golf.  He was elected to the presidency of the Southwestern Athletic Conference (SWAC) on three occasions.  Long began his football coaching career at Paul Quinn College from 1921 to 1922, then continued at Wiley College located in Marshall, Texas from 1923 to 1947.  He coached at Prairie View A&M University in 1948 and at Texas College from 1949 to 1955 before return to Wiley for a second stint that lasted from 1956 to 1965.  His overall record in 45 years as college football head coach was 227–151–31.

In 1925, Long helped inaugurate the State Fair Classic during the State Fair of Texas matching his Wiley Wildcat team against Langston University each year until 1929 when Langston was replaced by Prairie View.  The game was always on Negro Day of the state fair and soon was drawing in excess of 20,000 fans to the Cotton Bowl (stadium).  In 1948, after Long had left Wiley and was at Prairie View, he was honored at half-time of the game and given a Buick automobile by members of the Fred Long Anniversary committee to celebrate his then 25 years of coaching in the Southwestern Conference.

On November 11, 1961, Long, with 215 coaching victories at the time, coached Wiley against Southern, led by Ace Mumford, who had 232 coaching victories, in the first known college football match-up in which both coaches had over 200 victories.  Long's Wiley team won, 21–19.

During his long tenure at Wiley, Long also served as athletic director.  The Fred Thomas Long Student Union building there is named in his honor.

Honors and death
In 1962, Long was inducted into the National Association of Intercollegiate Athletics Hall of Fame.  He became a charter member of the Millikin University Athletic Hall of Fame in 1970, the Texas Black Sports Hall of Fame in 1996 and Southwestern Athletic Conference Hall of Fame in 2001.  On January 11, 2010, Fred T. Long was posthumously honored with the American Football Coaches Association (AFCA) 2009 Trailblazer Award.

Long died on March 23, 1966 in Texas.

Head coaching record

See also
 List of college football coaches with 200 wins

References

External links
 and Seamheads

1896 births
1966 deaths
Detroit Stars players
Indianapolis ABCs players
Millikin Big Blue baseball players
Millikin Big Blue football players
Paul Quinn Tigers football coaches
Prairie View A&M Panthers football coaches
Texas College Steers football coaches
Wiley Wildcats athletic directors
Wiley Wildcats football coaches
Sportspeople from Decatur, Illinois
African-American coaches of American football
African-American players of American football
Place of death missing
Coaches of American football from Illinois
Baseball players from Illinois
Players of American football from Illinois
20th-century African-American sportspeople